John Christopher Roderick Dow, FBA (1916–1998) was a British applied economist whose career ran from 1945 until his death in 1998.

He was educated at Bootham School, York and University College London.

During his career he worked in some of the major British economic institutions, serving as Senior Economic Adviser to the UK Treasury, Deputy Director of the National Institute of Economic and Social Research, Assistant Secretary General of the OECD, and as Executive Director of the Bank of England. Dow's achievements as an economist were recognized with the award of a Fellowship of the British Academy (1982).

Major publications 
Major Recessions: Britain and the World, 1920-1995 (Oxford, 1999), published posthumously
Inside the Bank of England: Memoirs of Christopher Dow

References

Additional sources 
Dow, J. C. R., Graham Hacche, and C. T. Taylor. (2012). Inside the Bank of England memoirs of Christopher Dow, Chief Economist, 1973-84. Basingstoke: Palgrave Macmillan

People educated at Brighton, Hove and Sussex Grammar School
1916 births
1998 deaths
People educated at Bootham School
20th-century  British economists
Fellows of the British Academy